Chaeteessa nana is a species of praying mantis in the Chaeteessidae family.

References

Mantodea
Articles created by Qbugbot
Insects described in 1995